Guskara railway station is a railway station of Sahibganj loop line under Howrah railway division of Eastern Railway zone. It is situated beside Guskara–Dignagar Road at Guskara in Purba Bardhaman district in the Indian state of West Bengal. Toatal 40 express and passenger trains stop at Guskara railway station. It is a NSG-5 (non suburban group-5) category rail station.

Trains
Some of the major trains available from Guskara railway station are as follows:
 Sealdah-Rampurhat Maa Taara Express
 Sealdah-Bamanhat Uttar Banga Express
 Howrah-Bolpur Shantiniketan Express
 Howrah–Jamalpur Express
 Howrah–Malda Town Intercity Express
 Howrah-Azimganj Ganadevata Express

References

Railway stations in Purba Bardhaman district
Howrah railway division